CLG Naomh Columba is a Gaelic football only GAA club based in Gleann Cholm Cille, County Donegal, Ireland. The club fields both men's and ladies' teams from underage as far as senior level. They enjoy an intense rivalry with neighbours, Cill Chartha, although the rivalry has subdued somewhat in the last number of years as the clubs have played in different divisions.

History
Naomh Columba, in their current existence were founded in 1964, although football was played in the parish for decades before this and a Junior club existed since 1944. They have won the Donegal Senior Football Championship twice, in 1978 and 1990.

Michael Oliver McIntyre captained the team to the 1978 title.

The club also won the Donegal Junior Football Championship in 1974. The club has won 2 Comórtas Peile na Gaeltachta titles and 7 Division 1 League titles. The club's most successful season came in 1978, when they claimed the championship, league and Comórtas Peile na Gaeltachta treble, as well as the county under-21 title. They remain the only Donegal club to complete this treble, although Gaoth Dobhair won a league, championship and Ulster championship treble in 2018.

Naomh Columba were once one of the most feared and respected teams in Donegal, reaching 6 senior county finals in 9 years between 1990 and 1998, but since their relegation to the Intermediate Championship and Division 3 of the league in 2007, the senior team have struggled to make any great impact on the Donegal club scene.

They defeated Na Cealla Beaga in the 1990 Donegal SFC final. Among the winning players were Noel Hegarty and two uncles of Dessie Farrell, Noel Carr and Séamus Carr. Indeed, Séamus Carr at half-forward was man of the match in the final, scoring five points (each one from play), while John Joe Doherty was captain. 1978 captain McIntyre (by then a team mentor alongside Paddy "Beag" Gillespie and Seán Burke) played at full-forward in the 1990 final, which Hegarty won a with a last minute free. However, the club lost the 1992 final to the same team.

The Donegal 1992 All-Ireland winning team had two players from Naomh Columba in the panel - Noel Hegarty and John Joe Doherty. John Joe Doherty was selected as an All Star in 1993. Aaron Doherty currently plays for the Donegal senior team, having featured, and scored, in a number of matches in the 2022 league campaign.

Notable players

 Aaron Doherty — 2019 Ulster SFC winning panelist; 2022 Ulster SFC playing finalist
 John Joe Doherty — 1992 All-Ireland SFC winner
 Noel Hegarty — 1992 All-Ireland SFC winner

 Noel McGinley – 1998 Ulster SFC finalist

Managers

Honours

References

Gaelic games clubs in County Donegal
Gaelic football clubs in County Donegal
The Rosses